Robert “Rob” Paterson (born October 17, 1967 in San Diego, California) is a former U.S. soccer forward who spent two seasons in the Western Soccer Alliance and one in the American Professional Soccer League.

Paterson began his collegiate career at San Diego State University in 1987.  In 1988, he transferred to the University of Evansville where he played on the men’s soccer team.  He was part of the SDSU team which went to the semifinals of the NCAA Division I tournament. In 1989, Paterson was named a first team All American and was honored as the ISAA Player of the Year.  He finished his two seasons at Evansville with 42 goals and 11 assists.  In 1997 Evansville inducted Paterson into its Athletic Hall of Fame.

In 1987, Paterson joined the semi-pro San Diego Nomads of the Western Soccer Alliance.  He spent the 1989 collegiate off season with the Nomads.  However, in 1990, he moved to the Portland Timbers of the American Professional Soccer League which was formed by the merger of the WSA and American Soccer League.  He scored eight goals with the Timbers.  His four assists that season led the team.

References

External links
 1989 San Diego Nomads roster

1967 births
Living people
Soccer players from San Diego
American soccer players
Evansville Purple Aces men's soccer players
San Diego State Aztecs men's soccer players
Indoor soccer players
Western Soccer Alliance players
Nomads Soccer Club players
American Professional Soccer League players
Portland Timbers (1985–1990) players
All-American men's college soccer players
Association football forwards